All over the world, national Soling associations held since 1968 national championships. In some counties the winner of the event became the National Champion even if the winning team came from a different country, like the Netherlands, Sweden or the United States. In other countries like Germany, Austria or Italy the Champion is the first team from the organizing country even if they do not win the event. Since the Soling has always been an "open" class in that spirit we list in this overview the winners of the event. The first boat of the organizing country can be found in the references.

The Australian Soling Championship is recognized as an Continental Championship like the Europeans and the North and South Americans. Therefor the Championships of New South Wales and Western Australia are listed. However Scotland is not a member of World Sailing they Nationals are listed any way since the event is listed under National Championships in the Soling Guide of 1996-2000.

Winners of National Championships

References 

Soling competitions